Vincent Michael Martella (born October 15, 1992) is an American actor best known for providing the voice of Phineas Flynn in the Disney Channel original animated show Phineas and Ferb, which ran from 2007 to 2015. He is also known for his role as Greg Wuliger in Chris Rock's hit show Everybody Hates Chris (2005–2009), and providing the voice of Hope Estheim in the 2010 video game Final Fantasy XIII and its sequels Final Fantasy XIII-2 (2011) and Lightning Returns: Final Fantasy XIII (2013).

Early life
Martella was born in Rochester, New York, and is of Italian descent. During his childhood, he moved to central Florida. He graduated from DeLand High School in 2011 and is studying for an online degree in business through the University of Florida.

Career
Martella appeared in the feature film Role Models starring Seann William Scott and Paul Rudd. He has a lead role in the film Bait Shop along with Bill Engvall and Billy Ray Cyrus. He also played Scoop in the Nickelodeon sitcom Ned's Declassified School Survival Guide and Greg in the UPN/CW sitcom Everybody Hates Chris.

He recorded his first album Time Flies By, playing the piano and singing. The album was written and co-produced by Vincent and is available on iTunes. 

Martella became known in the voice acting world by playing the voice of Phineas Flynn in the Disney Channel and Disney XD animated series Phineas and Ferb. He also provided the English voice of Hope Estheim, a main character in the 2010 video game Final Fantasy XIII, and reprised his role for Final Fantasy XIII-2. He did the voice of the teenage Jason Todd / Robin for the animated film Batman: Under the Red Hood, in which his younger brother, Alexander, provided the voice for the child version of Todd. Martella reprised his role as Jason Todd for Batman: Death in the Family.

Martella also appeared in the fourth season of The Walking Dead television series as Patrick.

Personal life
Martella is the son of Donna and Michael Martella. His father owns Captain Tony's, a chain of pizzerias.

Filmography

Film

Television
{| class="wikitable sortable"
|-
! Year
! Title
! Role
! class="unsortable" | Notes
|-
| 2004–06
| Ned's Declassified School Survival Guide
| Scoop
| 3 episodes
|-
| 2005–09
| Everybody Hates Chris
| Greg Wuliger
| 86 episodes
|-
| 2007
| Can You Dig It
| Barry
| rowspan="3"|Voice
|-
| 2007–present
| Phineas and Ferb
| rowspan="2"|Phineas Flynn
|-
| 2010–11
| Take Two with Phineas and Ferb
|-
| 2011
| Love Bites
| Josh Ford
| Episode: "Sky High"
|-
| rowspan="2"|2012
| R. L. Stine's The Haunting Hour
| Jean-Louis
| Episode: "Poof De Fromage"
|-
| The Mentalist
| Martin Klubock
| Episode: "Something's Rotten in Redmond"
|-
| 2013–14
| The Walking Dead
| Patrick
| ("30 Days Without an Accident", "Infected", "A")
|-
| 2016–19
| Milo Murphy's Law
| Bradley Nicholson / Phineas Flynn 
| Voices
|-
| 2022
|Chibiverse
| Phineas Flynn
| Episode: "The Great Chibi Mix-Up!"
|}

Video games

Awards and nominations

References

External links

 
 Interview with Teen Scene magazine
 Interview with Piper Reese from Piper's Picks TV''.

1992 births
Living people
American male child actors
American male film actors
American male television actors
American male video game actors
American male voice actors
American people of Italian descent
Male actors from Florida
Male actors from Rochester, New York
People from DeLand, Florida
20th-century American male actors
21st-century American male actors
21st-century American singers